North Carolina Highway 131 (NC 131) is a primary state highway in the U.S. state of North Carolina.  It connects the city of Bladenboro to Fayetteville, via NC 87, and Whiteville, via US 701.

Route description
NC 131 is a two-lane rural highway that begins at US 701 north of Whiteville.  In Bladenboro, it shares concurrencies with NC 242 and NC 410 along its Main Street crossing NC 211 Business at Seaboard Street.  It soon splits from NC 242, which continues north to Elizabethtown, followed by crossing NC 211 By-Pass, before leaving Bladenboro.   later, it splits from NC 410, which continues north to Dublin.  At NC 41, NC 131 has a brief  overlap; it is noticeable that the routing here was reconfigured to slowdown NC 131 at this location.  At the end of its journey, NC 131 meets with NC 87, in Tar Heel; where travelers can continue on to Fayetteville or Elizabethtown.

NC 131 goes through predominantly forested or farmlands in the area, with Bladenboro being the only urban location along its route.

History
NC 131 was established in 1949 as a new primary routing from US 701 north of Whiteville to NC 87 in Tar Heel.  In 1970, NC 131 was rerouted onto a new road east of downtown Tar Heel.  In 2015, NC 131 was realigned on new road and brief overlap with NC 41, eliminating an intersection; old alignment was downgraded to secondary roads, with some partial removal of roadway.

Junction list

References

External links

 
 NCRoads.com: N.C. 131

131
Transportation in Columbus County, North Carolina
Transportation in Bladen County, North Carolina